William Belden Noble Lectures is an American series of annual presentations by accomplished individuals, held at Harvard University.

The Lectures were established in 1898 through a bequest by Nannie Yulee Noble in memory of her husband, a divinity student who died while preparing for the ministry. Speakers deliver a systematized collection of lectures on a theme of Christian thought.

According to the terms of the bequest: “The object of the Founder of the Lectures is to continue the mission of her husband, whose supreme desire was to extend the influence of Jesus as ‘the Way, the Truth, and the Life,’ and to illustrate and enforce the words of Jesus — ‘I am come that they might have life and that they might have it more abundantly.’ The Founder has in view the presentation of the personality of Jesus as given in the New Testament, or unfolded in the history of the Christian Church, or illustrated in the inward experience of His followers, or as the inspiration to Christian Missions for the conversion of the world. The scope of the Lectures is believed to be as wide as the highest interests of humanity.”

Lecturers

 1898 - Francis G. Peabody
 1899 – George Herbert Palmer
 1900 – William Henry Fremantle
 1904 – William Boyd Carpenter
 1907 – Charles Henry Brent
 1909 – Henry Churchill King
 1910 – Theodore Roosevelt
 1911 – Wilfred Thomason Grenfell
 1911 – John Neville Figgis
 1924 – Arthur Cayley Headlam
 1925 – Henry Major
 1957 – Alexander "Lex" Miller
 1968 – Harvey Cox
1969 – Frederick Buechner (lectures published under title, The Alphabet of Grace, in 1970)
 Eugene McCarthy
 1981 – Dr Edward D.A. Hulmes, (see www.edwardhulmes.co.uk)
 1982 – Robert N. Bellah
 Archbishop Robert Runcie of Canterbury
 Hans Küng
 1995 – J. Barrie Shepherd
 Paul Tillich (schedule for 1995, but died before the date)
 1998 – Armand Nicholi
 2000 – John Shelby Spong
 2003 – Francis S. Collins
 2004 – Dr. Tim Johnson
 2005 – Owen Gingerich
 2006 – N. T. Wright
 2013 – Janet McKenzie
 2014 – Joshua DuBois
 2015 - Stanley Nelson
 2016 – Marilynne Robinson
 2019 - Rev. Raphael Warnock
 2022 - John Green
 2022 - Dr. Norman Wirzba

References

External links
Michelstein, Erica R. "Nicholi Lectures on Moral Law". The Harvard Crimson (October 6, 1998) (guest speaker Armand Nicholi)
"Harvard's Noble Lectures". Pietisten (Winter 2004–2005) (guest speaker Dr. Tim Johnson)
"Theologian, Anglican Bishop Wright to deliver Belden Noble Lectures". Harvard University Gazette (October 12, 2006) (guest speaker Nicholas Thomas Wright)
"Joshua DuBois, Former Pastor-In-Chief, Lectures on Faith in Politics". "The Harvard Crimson" (April 7, 2014) (guest speaker Joshua DuBois)

Christian theological lectures
Harvard University
1898 establishments in Massachusetts